Great Russia, sometimes Great Rus', is a name formerly applied to the territories of "Russia proper", the land that formed the core of Muscovy and later Russia. This was the land to which the ethnic Russians were native and where the ethnogenesis of (Great) Russians took place. The name is said to have come from the Greek ,  used by Byzantines for the northern part of the lands of Rus'.

From 1654–1721, Russian Tsars adopted the word - their official title included the wording (literal translation): "The Sovereign of all Rus': the Great, the Little, and the White".

The term is mentioned in the opening lines of the State Anthem of the Soviet Union: "An unbreakable union of free republics, Great Russia has sealed forever."

Similarly, the terms Great Russian language and Great Russians were employed by ethnographers and linguists in the 19th century, but have since fallen out of use.

The area became, together with the Volga-Ural region, North Caucasus and Siberia, the Russian SFSR, while Little Russia and White Russia became the Ukrainian SSR and the Byelorussian SSR respectively.

Related topics 
 All-Russian nation
 Etymology of Rus and derivatives: From Rus' to Rossiya
 Greater Poland
 Little Russia
 Novorossiya (New Russia)
 White Russia (disambiguation)

References

Rus
Geographic history of Russia
History of Ruthenia